is a Japanese dark fantasy manga series written and illustrated by Rino Mizuho. It has been serialized in the monthly  manga magazine Ciao and its sister magazine, since September 2008.

A 13-episode original video animation produced by SynergySP was released between 2011 and 2012, while a live-action film adaptation was released to Japanese theatres in 2021.

In 2021, The Magic of Chocolate won the 66th Shogakukan Manga Award in the children's category.

Synopsis
The Magic of Chocolate is a series focusing on Chocolat Aikawa, the owner of a chocolaterie called Chocolat Noir, located deep in the forest. She sells chocolates that can grant wishes when consumed. However, the chocolates come at a price; as payment, Chocolat will take something precious to the customer. Many of her customers have concerns or grievances they wish to remedy with the chocolates, though some aim to abuse the chocolates' magic for nefarious purposes; Chocolat will curse those who do so to "plunge into the depths of darkness," resulting in often bizarre and ironic retributions.

Characters
 
 
 An emotionally stoic chocolatier, and owner of the Chocolat Noir. She is always seen dressed in lolita fashion.
 
 
 A chocolate devil who was summoned by Chocolat's father, Shūga, and lives together with her. He is usually seen in the form of a black cat.

Media

Manga
The Magic of Chocolate is written and illustrated by Rino Mizuho. It has been serialized irregularly in the monthly magazine Ciao and its sister magazine, since September 3, 2008. Shogakukan has collected its chapters into individual tankōbon volumes, under the Ciao Horror Comics imprint. The first volume was released on July 1, 2009. As of 2023, twenty-two volumes have been released.

Instead of being ordered numerically, each volume is named according to the English alphabet. From October 11 to November 1, 2013, columnist  held a contest on Twitter for contestants to guess the subtitle of the then-upcoming volume 10, slated to begin with the letter "J." Mizuho herself judged the results, with the prizes awarded to the first three people who were able to answer correctly, as well as special jury awards such as the "Nice Silly Answer Award" and the "Cool & Sweet Award."

The series is licensed for Southeast Asian distribution in English by Shogakukan Asia.

Volume list

Anthologies

OVA

An original video animation adaptation was announced on the wrap-around band released with volume 3 on November 29, 2010. The episodes were distributed through the Ciao Ciao TV! DVD discs included in the monthly magazine Ciao, starting with the April 2011 issue; the final episode was published with the February 2013 issue. All episodes are currently available to watch on Ciao's official YouTube channel.

Light novels
The light novel series is published by Shogakukan under the Shogakukan Junior Bunko imprint.

Film
A live-action movie adaptation, first announced in January 2021, was released on June 18 the same year. The film stars Maho Yamaguchi as Chocolat in her film debut. It is produced by Shinya Furugori and Kana Ohtsubo, with Tomonobu Morikawa directing and Tatsuya Kanazawa writing the script.

Other media and merchandise
An official fanbook titled The Magic of Chocolate: H to I was released on April 30, 2013. In February 2013, The Magic of Chocolate collaborated with lolita fashion brand Baby, The Stars Shine Bright to produce a dress based on Chocolat.

Reception
Along with Duel Masters, The Magic of Chocolate won the 66th Shogakukan Manga Award in the children category in 2021.

References

External links

2011 anime OVAs
Dark fantasy anime and manga
Shogakukan manga
Shōjo manga
Winners of the Shogakukan Manga Award for children's manga
Japanese fantasy films